Sripathi Panditharadhyula Kodandapani (  5 April 1974) was an Indian music composer and playback singer in Telugu cinema. He composed music for more than 100 films. He made his debut as an playback singer in the 1955 film Santhanam. Later, he debuted as a music director in the 1961 film Kanna Koduku. Early in his career, he gained fame as a composer for folklore-based films. Later, he composed films in varied genres.

Kodandapani's notable films as a music director include Guruvunu Minchina Sishyudu (1963), Thotalo Pilla - Kotalo Rani (1964), Jwala Dweepa Rahasyam (1965), Bangaru Timmaraju (1965), Devata (1965), Sri Sri Sri Maryada Ramanna (1967), Gopaludu Bhoopaludu (1967), Sukha Dukhalu (1968), Manchi Kutumbam (1968), Manchi Mitrulu (1969), Kathanayika Molla (1970), Pandanti Kapuram (1972). Some of his notable compositions include songs like "Aalayaana Velasina Aa Devudi Reethi" from Devata, "Idi Mallela Velayani" and "Medante Meda Kadu" from Sukha Dukhalu.

He introduced S. P. Balasubrahmanyam to playback singing in the film Sri Sri Sri Maryada Ramanna (1967) and mentored him in his early career. Balasubrahmanyam considered Kodandapani to be his guru and would reminisce Kodandapani throughout his life and would often pay tributes to him. Kodandapani died on 5 April 1974 at an early age of 42.

Life
S. P. Kodandapani was born in 1932 in Guntur. He spent his childhood in Guntur. He used to sing songs and poems and learned to play harmonium. He went to Madras looking for opprtunities to work in the film industry. Addepalli Rama Rao gave him a chance to sing in the chorus in the in 1953 film Naa Illu. Later, he worked as a harmonium player with Susarla Dakshinamurthi. He sang as an independent singer in the 1955 film Santhanam. He also worked with the music director K. V. Mahadevan for some time.

He became music director as an independent charge for the first time in Kanna Koduku (1961), followed by Padandi Munduku (1962), Manchi Rojulochayi, Bangaru Timmaraju (1964), Thotalo Pilla - Kotalo Rani (1964), Loguttu Perumallakeruka (1966) and others. The song "Medante Meda Kaadu" from the film Sukha Dukhalu (1968) composed by him brought recognition to Balasubrahmanyam in Telugu cinema.

Kodandapani is the music director in the Rekha Murali and Arts production company established by comedian and his former roommate Padmanabham.

Legacy 
Kodandapani introduced S. P. Balasubrahmanyam to playback singing in the film Sri Sri Sri Maryada Ramanna (1967) and mentored him in his early career. Balasubrahmanyam considered Kodandapani to be his guru and would reminisce Kodandapani throughout his life and would often pay tributes to him. He named his recording theatre after Kodandapani. He also named his film production company after him as 'Sri Kodandapani Film Circuits'.

Filmography
 Santhanam (1955)
 Kanna Kodulu (1961)
 Padandi Munduku (1962)
 Bangaru Thimmaraju (1964)
 Devatha (1965)
 Jwaladeepa Rahasyam (1965)
 Keelu Bommalu (1965)
 Manchi Kutumbam (1968)
 Loguttu Perumallakeruka (1966)
 Potti Pleader (1966)
 Aata Bommalu (1966)
 Apoorva Piravaigal (1967)
 Sri Sri Sri Maryada Ramanna (1967)
 Nenante Nene (1968)
 Ranabheri (1968)
 Aastulu Antastulu (1969)
 Gopaludu Bhoopaludu (1969)
 Kuzhandai Ullam (1969) (Tamil)
 Manchi Mitrulu (1969)
 Sri Rama Katha (1969)
 Kathanayika Molla (1970)
 Lakshmi Kataksham (1970)
 Suguna Sundari Katha (1970)
 Goodu Puthani (1972)
 Pandanti Kapuram (1972)
 Gandhi Puttina Desam (1973)
 Abhimanavantulu (1973)
 Bangaaru Timmaraju (1965)
 Mallamma Katha (1973) Released soon after his death.
 Into Dongalu (1973).

References

External links
 

Telugu film score composers
Telugu people
People from Guntur
Film musicians from Andhra Pradesh
Singers from Andhra Pradesh
20th-century Indian composers
20th-century Indian singers
1974 deaths